The 1953 Lehigh Engineers football team was an American football team that represented Lehigh University during the 1953 college football season. Lehigh placed last in the Middle Three Conference.

In their sixth year under head coach William Leckonby, the Engineers compiled a 4–5 record. They lost their sole conference game, against Lafayette; for the second straight year, Lehigh did not meet its other conference rival, Rutgers. Thomas Gunn was the team captain.

Lehigh played its home games at Taylor Stadium on the university's main campus in Bethlehem, Pennsylvania.

Schedule

References

Lehigh
Lehigh Mountain Hawks football seasons
Lehigh Engineers football